Travel Guard is the product name for travel insurance and assistance services provided by AIG Travel and American International Group, Inc.

History 
In 1982 John M. Noel developed the Travel Guard product while he was working at Sentry Insurance. Soon, John purchased the rights to Travel Guard and by 1985 Travel Guard was operating out of the basement of its founder’s home. The company acquired Marathon Travel Shops in 1987.

Then, in 1991, the Travel Guard was acquired by French-based GMF, but Noel reacquired the company in 1993.

In 2000, Noel, David LaFayette and Nathan LaFayette created Travel Guard-Canada to offer travel insurance and travel services to Canadians. In May 2006, New York based American International Companies, Inc. (AIG) acquired Travel Guard. 

In July 2009, the company moved to its new home in a business park located off I-39 in Stevens Point. AIG subsidiary, National Union Fire Insurance Company, underwrites Travel Guard policies.

In 2012, Travel Guard became the product range name for all travel-related products and services of AIG.

Operating Territory 
AIG Travel has Travel Guard service centers in Stevens Point, WI; Houston, Texas; Shoreham, United Kingdom; Kuala Lumpur, Malaysia, Okinawa, Japan; Mexico City, Mexico; Sofia, Bulgaria; and Guangzhou, China.

References

External links 
Travel Guard US Website
Travel Guard International Website
Travel Guard UK Website
Travel Guard Germany Website
Travel Guard Italy Website
Travel Guard Czech Republic Website
Travel Guard Hungary Website
Travel Guard Norway Website
Travel Guard Poland Website
Travel Guard Finland Website
Travel Guard Ireland Website

Financial services companies established in 1982
Insurance companies of the United States
Companies based in Wisconsin
Stevens Point, Wisconsin
Travel insurance companies
American International Group
1982 establishments in Wisconsin
American companies established in 1982